The quadrate bone is a skull bone in most tetrapods, including amphibians, sauropsids (reptiles, birds), and early synapsids.

In most tetrapods, the quadrate bone connects to the quadratojugal and squamosal bones in the skull, and forms upper part of the jaw joint. The lower jaw articulates at the articular bone, located at the rear end of the lower jaw. The quadrate bone forms the lower jaw articulation in all classes except mammals.

Evolutionarily, it is derived from  the hindmost part of the primitive cartilaginous upper jaw.

Function in reptiles 
In certain extinct reptiles, the variation and stability of the morphology of the quadrate bone has helped paleontologists in the species-level taxonomy and identification of mosasaur squamates  and spinosaurine dinosaurs.

In some lizards and dinosaurs, the quadrate is articulated at both ends and movable. In snakes, the quadrate bone has become elongated and very mobile, and contributes greatly to their ability to swallow very large prey items.

Function in mammals 
In mammals, the articular and quadrate bones have migrated to the middle ear and are known as the malleus and incus.  Along with the stapes, which is homologous to some reptilian and amphibian Columella (auditory system), these are known as the ossicles and are a defining characteristic of mammals.

Development 
In pig embryos, the mandible ossifies on the side of Meckel's cartilage, while the posterior part of that cartilage is ossified into the incus. In later development, this portion detaches from the rest of the cartilage and migrates into the middle ear.

References

External links
 

Skeletal system
Skull